West Ham Jewish Cemetery  is a cemetery for Jews  in West Ham in the London Borough of Newham, England. It was established in 1856 by the New Synagogue on Great St. Helen's, soon joined by the Great Synagogue in Duke's Place, both of them London congregations.

There are a number of notable people buried here, in a graveyard visually dominated by the imposing Rothschild Mausoleum. One section contains graves removed to this burial place from the former Hoxton burial ground of the Hambro Synagogue when that site underwent urban redevelopment. The oldest legible tombstone in this section dates from 1794.

Rothschild Mausoleum
The Rothschild Mausoleum is circular, domed, mausoleum built in 1866 by Ferdinand James von Rothschild for his late wife Evelina de Rothschild who died in childbirth at age 27.   The architect was Matthew Digby Wyatt.   It is fashioned of marble in Renaissance revival style. Nikolaus Pevsner notes the "dome of Eighteenth-century detail on attached Corinthian columns" and praises the ironwork and stone  carving, calling it worthy of "the attention of the student of  mid-Victorian detail."

Anti-Semitic attack

In 2005 a number of monuments were destroyed and graves desecrated in what the police described as an attack by anti-Semitic vandals. The doors of the mausoleum were pounded with heavy iron bars until they were bashed in, then they were torn from the building.

Notable burials
 Evelina de Rothschild (1839–1866), socialite
 Ferdinand James von Rothschild (1839–1898)
 Sir David Salomons, 1st Baronet (1797–1873), a leading figure in the 19th-century struggle for Jewish emancipation in the United Kingdom. He was the first Jewish Sheriff of the City of London and Lord Mayor of London.
 Philip Salomons (1796–1867), financier and High Sheriff of Sussex.

War graves

The cemetery has five Commonwealth service war graves, four from World War I and one from World War II. A German soldier (prisoner of war) and two German civilian internees from the former war are also buried here.

See also
 Jewish cemeteries in the London area
 United Synagogue

References

External links
 Official website

1856 establishments in England
1866 establishments in England
1856 in London
Jewish Cemeteries in London, West Ham
Buildings and structures completed in 1866
Jewish Cemeteries in London, West Ham
Cemetery vandalism and desecration
Commonwealth War Graves Commission cemeteries in England
West Ham
Jewish mausoleums
Jewish Cemeteries in London, West Ham
Mausoleums in England
Monuments and memorials in London
Renaissance Revival architecture in England

Jewish Cemetery